Bartholomew Moore Gatling (April 12, 1871 – August 2, 1950) was an American college football coach and lawyer. He served as the head football coach at North Carolina College of Agriculture and Mechanic Arts—now known as North Carolina State University—from 1893 to 1895, compiling a record of 4–4–1.

Gatling was born in Raleigh, North Carolina to John Gatling, a prominent lawyer and former member of the North Carolina Senate, and Sarah Louis Moore Gatling. He earned a Bachelor of Arts from the University of North Carolina in 1892 and a Bachelor of Laws degree from Harvard Law School in 1895. Gatling practiced law in Raleigh and was the chairman of the Wake Democratic Executive Committee. He was Raleigh's postmaster from 1915 to 1922. Gatling continued his law practice until his death, on August 2, 1950, at his birthplace in Raleigh.

Head coaching record

References

External links
 

1871 births
1950 deaths
NC State Wolfpack football coaches
Harvard Law School alumni
University of North Carolina at Chapel Hill
Sportspeople from Raleigh, North Carolina
Coaches of American football from North Carolina
North Carolina Democrats
North Carolina lawyers